
Year 789 (DCCLXXXIX) was a common year starting on Thursday (link will display the full calendar) of the Julian calendar. The denomination 789 for this year has been used since the early medieval period, when the Anno Domini calendar era became the prevalent method in Europe for naming years.

Events 
 By place 

 Europe 
 King Charlemagne crosses the Elbe River with a Frankish-Saxon army into Obotrite territory. He subdues the Wiltzes, and reaches the Baltic.
 King Pepin of Italy conquers Istria on the Adriatic, ignoring Byzantine protests. He establishes a tributary march, and sends missionaries.
 Charlemagne issues the Admonitio generalis, which covers educational and ecclesiastical reforms within the Frankish Kingdom.
 Charlemagne founds the town of Herford (modern Germany), in order to guard a ford crossing the narrow Werre River.

 Britain 
 King Beorhtric of Wessex marries Princess Eadburh, daughter of King Offa of Mercia, and accepts Mercian overlordship.
 Constantine I is installed as king of the Picts. He becomes one of the greatest Scottish monarchs in the Viking period.
 The Anglo-Saxon Chronicle records the first appearance of Vikings in England. The Viking raid on Portland in Dorset is the first of its kind recorded in the British Isles, including Ireland. The reeve of Dorchester (a local high-ranking official) goes to greet them after they land, perhaps accustomed to welcoming Scandinavian merchants. He is killed. Viking attacks increase in intensity over the coming decades.

 Islamic Caliphate 
 Al-Khayzuran, widow of former Abbasid caliph Al-Mahdi, dies, leaving more of the effective and real power in the hands of Harun al-Rashid.
  Idris I reaches Volubilis and founds the Idrisid dynasty, ceding Morocco from the Abbasid caliphate and founding the first Moroccan state.

 Asia 
 An uprising in Japan leads to a major defeat for Emperor Kanmu, along with a severe drought and famine; the streets of the capital Nagaoka-kyō are clogged with the sick.

Births 
 Lu Shang, chancellor of the Tang Dynasty (d. 859)
 Ziryab, Muslim poet and musician (d. 857)

Deaths 
 February 20 – Leo of Catania, saint and bishop of Catania (b. 709)
 November 8 – Willehad, bishop of Bremen
 Al-Khayzuran, powerful wife and adviser of Abbasid caliph Al-Mahdi and the excellent mother of Al-Hadi and Harun Al-Rashid, the Abbasid caliphs, de facto co-ruler of the Abbasid Caliphate 
 Fiachnae mac Áedo Róin, king of Ulaid (Ireland)
 Amat al-Aziz Ghadir, was the mother of Abbasid prince; Ali ibn Harun al-Rashid.
 Hildeprand, duke of Spoleto
 Mauregatus, king of Asturias (or 788)
 Muhammad ibn Sulayman ibn Ali, Abbasid prince and provincial governor
 Torson, Frankish count of Toulouse (or 790)

References